Julio César Ramírez (born 30 April 1974) is a Uruguayan former footballer who played the majority of his career in Uruguay for Montevideo Wanderers, Miramar Misiones and Progreso. He also had a short stint in Chile for Audax Italiano.

Ramírez joined Montevideo Wanderers in 1988 at the age of 13.

Despite playing as a defender for the Wanderers, Ramírez became known as the "Prado Sniper" (Spanish: El francotirador del Prado) for his goalscoring - he often took penalties and free kicks for the team.

Ramírez left Montevideo Wanderers to join Audax Italiano ahead of the 2005 Chilean Torneo Apertura.

In mid-2005, Ramírez returned to Uruguay to join Miramar Misiones.

After joining Progreso in 2006, he was part of the team that won the 2006 Uruguayan Segunda División.

References

External links
 
 Julio Ramírez at playmakerstats.com (English version of ceroacero.es)
 Profile at Tenfield Digital 

1974 births
Living people
Footballers from Montevideo
Uruguayan footballers
Montevideo Wanderers F.C. players
Miramar Misiones players
C.A. Progreso players
Audax Italiano footballers
Chilean Primera División players
Uruguayan expatriate footballers
Expatriate footballers in Chile
Uruguayan expatriate sportspeople in Chile
Association football defenders